is a children's book by Argentine author Luis Pescetti. It was first published in 1991.

Books by Luis Pescetti
Children's novels
1991 children's books
1991 Argentine novels